Hexagonocaulon is an extinct genus of bryophyte that lived during the Middle Triassic. Its fossils have been found throughout the Southern Hemisphere, including the Antarctic Peninsula.

The plant is believed to have been small in size and to have reproduced through spores.  Of the bryophytes, Hexagonocaulon is considered to be most closely related to the liverworts.

References

Triassic plants
Prehistoric plant genera